The Heretics is the thirteenth full-length album by Greek extreme metal band Rotting Christ. It was released on 15 February 2019 via Season of Mist. Loudwire named it one of the 50 best metal albums of 2019.

Track listing

Personnel

Rotting Christ
Sakis Tolis – vocals, guitars, bass guitar, keyboards, percussion, production
Themis Tolis – drums

Additional personnel
Stelios Steele – poem narration (track 1, 4, 10)
Alexis Karametis – vocals (backing) (track 6)
Stratis Steele – vocals (choirs)
Alexandros Louziotis – vocals (choirs)
Giannis Stamatakis – vocals (choirs)
Theodoros Aivaliotis – vocals (choirs)
Nikos Velentzas – percussion
Stamatis Ampatalis – percussion
Vasilis Koutsouflakis – percussion
Manos Six – percussion
Irina Zybina – additional vocals (track 2)
Dayal Patterson – narration (track 3, 7)
Melechesh Ashmedi – vocals (track 8)

Production
Tony Lindgren – mastering
Vyacheslav Smishko – artwork
George Emmanuel – engineering
Maximos Manolis – cover art
Jens Bogren – mixing

Charts

References

Rotting Christ albums
2019 albums
Season of Mist albums